Rolf Georg Ericsson-Hemlin (18 November 1918 – 28 October 2000) was a Swedish ice hockey player. He competed in the men's tournament at the 1948 Winter Olympics.

References

External links
 

1918 births
2000 deaths
Ice hockey players at the 1948 Winter Olympics
Olympic ice hockey players of Sweden
Ice hockey people from Stockholm